Lieutenant commander Matthew Robert Todd  (3 May 1924 – 29 January 2020) was a submariner who commanded the Royal Navy's Submarine Escape Training Tank from 1964 to 1974 and pioneered the use of new equipment which replaced the old Davis Submerged Escape Apparatus to enable escape from much greater depths.

His father, Jack, was the MP for Berwick-upon-Tweed. His son, Mark, was the MP for South Derbyshire.

References

1924 births
Royal Navy personnel of World War II
20th-century Royal Navy personnel
2020 deaths
Graduates of Britannia Royal Naval College
Members of the Order of the British Empire
Royal Navy submarine commanders